Przemysł of Inowrocław (pl: Przemysł inowrocławski; ca. 1278 – November 1338/16 February 1339), was a Polish prince member of the House of Piast, Duke of Inowrocław during 1287-1314 (under the regency of his mother until 1294 and his brother during 1294-1296), after 1300 vassal of King Wenceslaus II of Bohemia, Duke of Dobrzyń during 1303-1305, after 1306 vassal of the Kingdom of Poland, Governor of the Duchy of Pomerelia (Gdańsk Pomerania) during 1306-1309 (on behalf of his uncle Władysław I the Elbow-high), after 1314 ruler over Bydgoszcz and Wyszogród, Duke of Inowrocław after 1320/24, in 1327 he exchange Inowrocław for Sieradz.

He was the second son of Ziemomysł of Inowrocław and Salome, daughter of Sambor II, Duke of Pomerelia. His godfather was probably Przemysł II of Greater Poland, who acted as a mediator in the meeting at Ląd between Bolesław the Pious and Leszek II the Black, where Ziemomysł finally could recover his Duchy.

Life

After the death of their father in 1287, Przemysł and his brothers Leszek and Kazimierz III inherited his domains; however, because they are minors, remained under the regency of their mother and paternal half-uncle Władysław I the Elbow-high until 1294, when Leszek, as the oldest brother, attained his majority and assumed the government and the guardianship of his brothers. Przemysł attained his majority ca. 1296, but initially ruled jointly with his brothers.

In 1300 he was forced to recognize the sovereignty of Wenceslaus II. During 1303-1312 he ruled Inowrocław on behalf of his brother Leszek, who was in captivity in Bohemia. In 1303 he supported the revolt against his uncle Siemowit of Dobrzyń, which resulted in his direct government over domains until 1305.  

In 1306 he paid homage to his uncle Władysław I, in return for which he was appointed Governor of Gdańsk Pomerania, with his base in Świecie. In addition, he tried without success to recover from the Teutonic Order the Michałów Land (with money received from Gerward, Bishop of Kujawy). The post of Governor was lost in 1309, as a result of the invasion of the Teutonic Order. 

Shortly after, Przemysł and his brother Casimir III where involved in a financial dispute with Bishop Gerward. In December 1310 both princes looted the district of Raciąż, who belonged to the Bishopric; on 2 January 1311 the Bishop excommunicated both for his robbery. and in response, Przemysł and Casimir III imprisoned both the Bishop and his brother Stanisław, Provost of Włocławek. Both parties made an agreement only on 22 November: the Bishop and his brother were released, and the excommunication against the princes was lifted.

In 1314 was made the formal division of the paternal inheritance between Przemysł and his brothers; he received the northern part of the Duchy, with the main districts of Bydgoszcz and Wyszogród. On 11 June 1318 Przemysł and Leszek entered into a treaty of mutual inheritance, and a few days later, between 18-23 June, Przemysł took part in the meeting at Sulejów. Two years later, in 1320, he testified during the Polish-Teutonic trial.

Between 1320/24 Leszek unexpectedly abdicated the government, leaving all the Duchy to Przemysł, who in 1325 granted the Magdeburg Law to the district of Solec Kujawski. 

Together with his brother, he maintain his alliance with Władysław I. In view of the constants wars against the Teutonic Order, and in order to facilitate the Polish King an open warfare, between 28 May 1327/14 October 1328 Przemysł agreed to exchange his ancestral domain of Inowrocław for Sieradz. In this conflict, the new Duke of Sieradz tried to serve as mediator; however, this didn't protect his domain to be ravaged by the Teutonic Knights.

Przemysł died between November 1338 and 16 February 1339, because witnesses of the Polish-Teutonic trial refers to him as recently deceased at this point. He never married or had offspring, and is unknown where he was buried.

References

Przemysł Inowrocławski (Sieradzki) in poczet.com [retrieved 18 February 2015].

1278 births
1330s deaths
Piast dynasty
13th-century Polish people
14th-century Polish people
People of Byzantine descent